Pyramid aka Building the Great Pyramid is a 2002 BBC Television documentary film which tells the story of the building of the Great Pyramid at Giza through the commentary of the fictional builder, Nakht.

Production
The film was produced by the BBC in co-production with the Discovery Channel and NDR.

Awards
 Primetime Emmy Award 2003
Outstanding Special Visual Effects for a Miniseries, Movie or Special
 International Emmy Awards 2004
Nominated: Outstanding Special Visual Effects for a Miniseries, Movie or a Special

Media information

DVD release
Released on Region 2 DVD as a bonus disc with Egypt.

Companion book

References

External links
 

2002 television films
2002 films
Films set in ancient Egypt
British docudrama films
Pyramids
Discovery Channel original programming
BBC television documentaries about prehistoric and ancient history
2000s British films
British drama television films